Jotun is a Norwegian multinational chemicals company dealing mainly in decorative paints and performance coatings (marine, protective and powder coatings). It is one of the world's largest manufacturers of paints and coating products. Jotun manufactures paints and varnishes for marine and industrial purposes, synthetic resins, floor coverings, polyurethane foam, heavy-duty coatings, binders, unsaturated polyesters, glass-fiber reinforced polyester pipes, tanks, and more.

Jotun merged with three other paint producers in 1971 and became not only Norway's largest paint producer but also one of the largest companies in Norway. As of January 2021, the company has a presence in more than 100 countries around the world, with more than 10,000 employees, 67 companies in 45 countries, and 40 production facilities in 21 countries.

As of 2021, Jotun had about 10,300 employees including one thousand employees within Norway. It operated 40 factories in 21 countries and is represented in 120 countries through distributors, offices, and agents.

History
Jotun began in the early 1920s as a paint and marine provisions merchant in Sandefjord, Norway. Sandefjord was a popular homeport for whaling ships, which used to get laid up in port every summer for repairs and maintenance. The company's founder, Odd Gleditsch had worked on whaling ships and felt there was a demand for such a provider in the whaling town. During those days, paint stores usually sold pigments, turpentine and linseed oil separately, leaving it to purchasers to buy and mix them. Gleditsch retired from the sea and opened a shop in Sandefjord to sell paints and provisions, but soon felt that a demand existed for ready-made paints. In 1926, he purchased an existing small chemical factory called Jotun. In the early 1930s, the company made its first popular ready-made paint called Arcanol, which was marketed to ship owners and shipyards, a strategy that Jotun continued to invest in. The 1920s and 1930s saw a boom in Norwegian shipping, especially in its dry cargo and tanker fleet, and Jotun took advantage of that.

To ensure an adequate stock existed in all principal ports for these Norwegian shipowners, Jotun began stocking paints in North Africa, Europe and the Americas. As the Middle East and Southeast Asian countries developed in the 1950s, Jotun began to market its products to ship suppliers there. The founder's son, Odd Gleditsch Jr., oversaw the company's expansion in the Middle East. Working with the Norwegian export council, he travelled to Libya where Jotun built its first overseas factory in 1962.  In 1967, Jotun opened its second international factory in Thailand. which became the base for its operations in Southeast Asia.

In 1982, Jotun opened a trading office in Hong Kong. As China began to open up, Jotun developed a joint venture in Shanghai with the Chinese shipping giant COSCO to provide paints to its shipyards and ships. During that time, Jotun established a separate company called Jotun Coatings which focused on the manufacture of paints. In the 1970s, the company began to develop solvent-free powder coatings.

Organization 
The Jotun Group has four divisions, with its head office in Sandefjord, Norway.

Subsidiaries
Jotun became Norway's largest paint manufacturer in the 1960s and was headquartered in one of Norway's most modern industrial complexes in Sandefjord, Norway. In the 1960s, Jotun also began establishing factories abroad, including a factory in Tripoli, Libya. In 1968, Jotun established its first factory in Thailand near the capital of Bangkok. In 1969, Jotun's Spanish subsidiary Gardex S.A. opened its paint factory in Valencia, Spain.

Subsidiary companies include Jotun Powder Coatings Pty Ltd. and Jotun Protective Coatings Pty Ltd. in Australia, Jotun Thailand Ltd. in Thailand, Jotun NOF in Singapore, Sdn Bhd in Malaysia, Jotun Polisan Boya Tic AS in Turkey, Jotun Hellas Ltd. in Greece, Jotun Brignola SpA in Italy, Jotun SAE in Spain, Jotun Polymer France SA in France, Jotun Deutschland GmbH in Germany, Jotun Polymer BV in the Netherlands, OY Jotun Scanpol AB in Finland, Jotun Danmark A/S in Denmark, Jotun Polymer Inc. in the U.A.E., JOTUN CZECH a.s.in the Czech Republic, Vera Klippan AB in Sweden, and Jotun-Henry Clark Ltd., Jotun Decorative Coatings Ltd., Jotun Polymber Ltd., and Corro Clark Coatings Ltd. in the United Kingdom.

Jotun and famous landmarks 
Jotun has been and is used on several landmarks.

These include:

 TS Queen Mary
 Taizhou Yangtze River Bridge in Taizhou, Jiangsu, China
 The Petronas Towers in Kuala Lumpur, Malaysia
 Burj Khalifa in Dubai, U.A.E.
 Burj Al Arab in Dubai, U.A.E.
 Kingdom Center in Riyadh, Saudi Arabia
 West Tower in Guangzhou, China
 Canton Tower in Guangzhou, China
 Esentai Tower in Almaty, Kazakhstan
 Southern Cross railway station in Melbourne, Australia
 Guangzhou TV Tower in Guangzhou, China
 MS Oasis of the Seas
 Haj Terminal in Jeddah, Saudi Arabia
 Marina Bay Sands in Marina Bay, Singapore
 Biomuseo in Panama City, Panama
 New Clark City Athletics Stadium in Capas, Philippines.

References

Related reading
 The Paint Business

External links 

 Jotun, vår Historie
 Jotun Paints Pakistan

Norwegian brands
Chemical companies of Norway
Sandefjord
Chemical companies established in 1926
Companies based in Sandefjord
Paint manufacturers
Norwegian companies established in 1926